Sandy Evans is an Australian jazz composer, saxophonist, and teacher. Recognition of her work has included receiving an Order of Australia Medal in 2010 for services to music.

Career 
In the early 1980s Evans played in Great White Noise with Michael Sheridan and formed the group Women and Children First. which included Jamie Fielding, Steve Elphick, Indra Lesmana and Tony Buck.  Later she formed Clarion Fracture Zone and was a member of the Sydney band Ten Part Invention and the Australian Art Orchestra.

Evans composed the music for the 1999 radio drama Testimony: The Legend of Charlie Parker, which showcased the poetry of Yusef Komunyakaa, and was broadcast on ABC's Soundstage FM.

In 2008 she delivered the 10th Annual Peggy Glanville-Hicks Address. At the APRA Music Awards of 2013, her composition Meetings at the Table of Time performed by members of the Australian Art Orchestra and the Sruthi Laya Ensemble won Performance of the Year and was nominated for Work of the Year – Jazz.

In 2014 she was awarded a PhD from Macquarie University, Australia, for practice-based research in Carnatic Jazz Intercultural music. She also received a Churchill Fellowship to visit India in 2014 and began to collaborate with Aneesh Pradhan and Shubha Mudgal. She is currently a lecturer in Jazz at the University of New South Wales.

Recordings
Sandy Evans has performed on more than 30 albums.

Blue Shift (1990) with Clarion Fracture Zone.
Zones On Parade (1993) with Clarion Fracture Zone.
What This Love Can Do (1994) with Clarion Fracture Zone.
Less Stable Elements (1996) with Clarion Fracture Zone.
Unidentified Spaces (2000) with Ten Part Invention 
Not in the Mood (2002) Sandy Evans Trio.
Canticle (2002) with Clarion Fracture Zone and featuring Paul Cutlan and Martenitsa Choir.
The Edge of Pleasure (2009) Sandy Evans Trio.
When the Sky Cries Rainbows (2011) 
Cosmic Waves (2012) Sandy Evans and Friends with Guru Kaaraikkudi Mani and Sruthi Laya.
Yonder (2013) with The Catholics 
Kapture (2015) with Bobby Singh, Brett Hirst, Toby Hall and Saragan Sriranganathan.
Bridge of Dreams (2018) Sandy Evans in collaboration with Sirens Big Band, Shubha Mudgal, Aneesh Pradhan, Sudhir Nayak and Bobby Singh. Developed over several years and recorded across two continents from Mumbai to Sydney.
Postcards from the Anthropocene (2020) Sandy Evans / Adam Hulbert / Hamish Stuart, Eupcaccia Records.

Awards

AIR Awards
The Australian Independent Record Awards (commonly known informally as AIR Awards) is an annual awards night to recognise, promote and celebrate the success of Australia's Independent Music sector.

|-
| AIR Awards of 2011
|When the Sky Cries Rainbows 
| Best Independent Jazz Album
| 
|-

Mo Awards
The Australian Entertainment Mo Awards (commonly known informally as the Mo Awards), were annual Australian entertainment industry awards. They recognise achievements in live entertainment in Australia from 1975 to 2016. Sandy Evans won two awards in that time.
 (wins only)
|-
| 1992
| Sandy Evans
| Female Jazz Instrumental Performer of the Year
| 
|-
| 1995
| Sandy Evans
| Jazz Instrumental Performer of the Year
| 
|-

References

External links 
 Official website
 Sandy Evans at the Australian Music Centre
Evans, Sandy (Sandra Janette) profile in Encyclopedia of Jazz Musicians at jazz.com
Sandy Evans to present the 10th Peggy Glanville-Hicks address

APRA Award winners
Australian women composers
Australian jazz composers
Australian jazz musicians
Australian jazz saxophonists
Year of birth missing (living people)
Living people
Recipients of the Medal of the Order of Australia
21st-century saxophonists
Women jazz saxophonists
21st-century women musicians
The Catholics members
Clarion Fracture Zone members